Salvador Vega Casillas (born 18 August 1961) is a Mexican politician affiliated with the PAN. He served as member of the Senate of the Republic (Mexico) (2012-2018). He also served as Deputy during the LIX Legislature, as well as a local deputy in the Congress of Michoacán.

Senator Vega Casillas was accused by Emilio Lozoya Austin, former director of Pemex, in July 2020 of receiving bribes in 2013-2014 to support energy reform legislation.

References

1961 births
Living people
People from Apatzingán
Politicians from Michoacán
Members of the Senate of the Republic (Mexico)
Members of the Chamber of Deputies (Mexico)
National Action Party (Mexico) politicians
21st-century Mexican politicians
Universidad Michoacana de San Nicolás de Hidalgo alumni
Members of the Congress of Michoacán